Alt-Info is a private TV Company  and online information portal in Georgia. It was founded in 2019 as a conservative media platform to "counter aggressive liberal censorship". Alt-Info was granted an authorisation by Georgian National Communications Commission in November 2020. It launched TV broadcasting in January 2021. 

Alt-Info Ltd. was founded by Shota Martinenko and Ciala Morgoshia in January 2019, who each own half of the company's shares. Members of Alt-Info participated in organization of several demonstrations and protests, including the protests against Tbilisi Pride in 2021. One of the sponsors of Alt-Info is Konstantine Morgoshia, a businessman who was founding member of Georgian March and Alliance of Patriots. In November 2021 members of Alt-Info established a political party called Conservative Movement. The party was officially registered by the National Agency of Public Registry on 7 December. Members of Alt-Info were also involved in founding of the non-profit (non-commercial) legal entity Alternative for Georgia in 2019.

The platform describes as its main goal to "overcome aggressive censorship imposed by the ideological mainstream and supply audience with as complete and objective information as possible".

On 5 November 2020 Facebook stated that it removed network connected to Alt-Info for "coordinated inauthentic behaviour". Its official website was attacked and shut down by hackers on 1 March 2022.

Conservative Movement/Alt Info

Members of Alt-Info founded a political party in late 2021. The party was named Conservative Movement, which was registered by the National Public Registry Agency on December 7. The founding congress was held on November 20, 2021. On April 11, 2022, the name of the party was changed to Conservative Movement/Alt Info. The members of the party declared as its main goals to build a conservative force which would be an alternative to both the governing Georgian Dream and opposition United National Movement, establish christian democracy instead of liberal democracy in Georgia, and pursue closer relations with Russia. It views Georgia's socio-economic problems as relating to Georgia's problematic relationship with the Russian Federation. The party maintains that Georgia can restore its territorial integrity only through normalization of relations with Russia and claims that Georgia would benefit more from being an ally of Russia and joining the Eurasian Economic Union. 

The party has not participated in any election yet.

On July 2, 2022, the party organized the demonstration against the gay parade and European integration in response to a pro-EU demonstration in Tbilisi asking the European Council to grant Georgia the status of a candidate for accession.

References

Television stations in Georgia (country)
Television channels and stations established in 2020
Georgian-language television stations
2019 establishments in Georgia (country)
Alternative media
Conservative media
Georgia (country)–Russia relations
Nationalist parties in Georgia (country)